Ignacio Alonso Parra Román (born 5 July 1985) is a Chilean former footballer who played as a midfielder for clubs in Chile and Romania.

Career
A product of Unión Española youth system, Parra coincided with players such as Gabriel Vilches, Alexis Norambuena, Roberto Órdenes, among athers. He made his professional debut in 2002. In the Chilean Primera División, he also played for Palestino. 

In his homeland, he also played for Deportes Melipilla, Fernández Vial, Trasandino, Deportes Copiapó and Provincial Osorno. As a member of Deportes Melipilla, he won the league title of the Primera B in 2004.

Abroad, he had a stint with Romanian side CSM Focșani in 2008 and a brief stint with Colombian side Junior in 2011.

Honours
Deportes Melipilla
 Primera B de Chile: 2004

Post-retirement

References

External links
 
 
 
 Ignacio Parra at PlaymakerStats.com

1985 births
Living people
Chilean footballers
Chilean expatriate footballers
Chilean Primera División players
Unión Española footballers
Club Deportivo Palestino footballers
Primera B de Chile players
Deportes Melipilla footballers
C.D. Arturo Fernández Vial footballers
Deportes Copiapó footballers
Tercera División de Chile players
Trasandino footballers
Liga II players
CSM Focșani players
Categoría Primera A players
Atlético Junior footballers
Segunda División Profesional de Chile players
Provincial Osorno footballers
Chilean expatriate sportspeople in Romania
Chilean expatriate sportspeople in Colombia
Expatriate footballers in Romania
Expatriate footballers in Colombia
Association football midfielders
Place of birth missing (living people)